Tim Cofield (born May 18, 1963) is a former professional American football player who played linebacker for four seasons for the Kansas City Chiefs, Buffalo Bills, and New York Jets. He later played six seasons in the Canadian Football League as a defensive end for four teams.

References 

1963 births
Living people
People from Murfreesboro, North Carolina
Players of American football from North Carolina
American football linebackers
American players of Canadian football
Buffalo Bills players
Calgary Stampeders players
Canadian football defensive linemen
Elizabeth City State Vikings football players
Hamilton Tiger-Cats players
Kansas City Chiefs players
Memphis Mad Dogs players
New York Jets players
Toronto Argonauts players